Esra Erdoğan Albayrak (born 1983) is a Turkish sociologist. She is the daughter of the 12th President of Turkey, Recep Tayyip Erdoğan, and the wife of the 66th Minister of Finance and Treasury, Berat Albayrak.

Family 
Her father is Recep Tayyip Erdoğan and her mother is Emine Erdoğan. She has three siblings: Ahmet Burak, Necmettin Bilal and Sümeyye. On 11 July 2004, she was married to Sadık Albayrak's son Berat Albayrak at the Lütfi Kırdar Convention and Exhibition Center. Guests at the ceremony included Romanian Prime Minister Adrian Năstase, Greek Prime Minister Kostas Karamanlis, Jordanian King Abdullah II, Pakistani President Pervez Musharraf, Minister of Foreign Affairs Abdullah Gül and Speaker of the Grand National Assembly Bülent Arınç. They have four children; Ahmet Akif (b. 2006), Emine Mahinur (b. 2009), Sadık (b. 2015) and Hamza Salih (b. 2020).

Education 
She completed her high school education in Kadıköy İmam Hatip High School and her undergraduate education in 2003 in the field of sociology and history at Indiana University. She received her master's degree from the University of California, Berkeley. In 2016, she completed her PhD in sociology at the same university. One of her friends whom she studied with described her as a person with "strong personality; strict beliefs about life, faith, politics and family".

Social activities 
She is a board member of TURKEN Foundation in New York, USA,  TÜRGEV (Turkey Youth and Education Services Foundation), and Green Crescent, established under the leadership of her father Recep Tayyip Erdoğan. She participated in the 'We are Volunteers, We Teach' campaign initiated by Ümraniye Municipality for disabled people and taught the alphabet to disabled girls.

References 

1983 births
Esra
Daughters of national leaders
Indiana University alumni
Living people
Turkish sociologists
Turkish women sociologists
Turkish people of Georgian descent
Turkish people of Arab descent